The Ehrenfest model (or dog–flea model) of diffusion was proposed by Tatiana and Paul Ehrenfest to explain the second law of thermodynamics. The model considers N particles in two containers. Particles independently change container at a rate λ. If X(t) = i is defined to be the number of particles in one container at time t, then it is a birth–death process with transition rates

  for i = 1, 2, ..., N
  for i = 0, 1, ..., N – 1

and equilibrium distribution .

Mark Kac proved in 1947 that if the initial system state is not equilibrium, then the entropy, given by

is monotonically increasing (H-theorem). This is a consequence of the convergence to the equilibrium distribution.

Interpretation of results
Consider that at the beginning all the particles are in one of the containers. It is expected that over time the number of particles in this container will approach  and stabilize near that state (containers will have approximately the same number of particles). However from mathematical point of view, going back to the initial state is possible (even almost sure). If we assume that particles change containers at rate one in a second, in the particular case of  particles, starting at equilibrium the return to equilibrium is expected to occur in  seconds, while starting at configuration  in one of the containers,  at the other, the return to that state is expected to take  years. This supposes that while theoretically sure, recurrence to the initial highly disproportionate state is unlikely to be observed.

Bibliography
 Paul and Tatjana Ehrenfest: Über zwei bekannte Einwände gegen das Boltzmannsche H-Theorem. Physikalische Zeitschrift, vol. 8 (1907), pp. 311–314.
 F.P. Kelly: The Ehrenfest model, in Reversibility and Stochastic Networks. Wiley, Chichester, 1979.  pp. 17–20.
 David O. Siegmund: Ehrenfest model of diffusion (mathematics). Encyclopædia Britannica.

References

Queueing theory
Diffusion
Stochastic models